Lawrence Chatman, better known as DJ Collage or Mista Chatman, is a reggae vocalist and electronic music producer. Raised in Chicago, he moved to the Bay Area in the early 1990s, and now calls Seattle home. His style of music is referred to as reggae fusion.

Biography
Trained in the old school tradition of "ram dance" DJ chatting made popular by artists such as Yellowman, Nicodemus, and Super Cat, Collage began his musical career performing weekly guest spots with live Jamaican reggae bands at the famed Wild Hare nightclub on Chicago's north side. After relocating to California he had the opportunity to perform and tour with established reggae artists such as U-Roy, Ras Michael, Barrington Levy, Messenjah, Raskidus, The Heptones, and Nicodemus. His vocals appeared two top ten hits in the year 1994, one with the reggae soundsystem/band The Positive Sound Massive titled "Unity" and another with local ambient/breakbeat group Dubtribe titled "Mother Earth".

In the year 2000, Collage self-released the CD Uptown/Downtown. This five track EP featured Collage spitting dancehall lyrics over hip-hop and raggamuffin beats. The EP received radio airplay in the US and Europe and the track "New Type Sound" was licensed by BSI Records and appeared on the Docking Sequence compilation.

In 2002 Collage was a guest vocalist of Vienna's downtempo crew Sofa Surfers. His vocals appear on three tracks on their Encounters CD, and he was invited to go on a month-long European tour with the band to support the release. (It was released in the US in 2004 as See the Light via ESL records.) Collage went on to work with other Viennese groups such as Stereotyp, I-Wolf, Megablast, Kung Fu Divas & Blockwerk. During this time Collage was also a frequent guest of the Viennese ragga/jungle night- "Wicked" run by the Wickedsquad. This led to him being a featured vocalist in their first vinyl release "Domo-Kun-Bogle" which is accompanied by a video which portrays Collage in animated form.

In 2003 Collage relocated to Seattle. But before he left the bay area, he linked up with Meat Beat Manifesto to record vocals for their ...In Dub CD & DVD release.

In Seattle Collage has worked and recorded with locals like IQU & Truckasauras.

Due to confusions with his performance name because of the "DJ" prefix, Collage officially changed his recording artist name to Mista Chatman in May 2010. His guest appearance on Delhi 2 Dublin's third album, Planet Electric, marked the debut of the name change.

Selected discography
As vocalist: 	 
Dubtribe Sound System, Mother Earth (12"), Mother Earth (Sunshine..., Organico, 1993
Archive Volume One 1991-1993 (2xCD), Mother Earth (Ragga Ea..., Imperial Dub Recordings, 1999
Sofa Surfers, Formula (12"), Babylon Thymes, Klein Records, 2002
Encounters (CD), Babylon Tymes, Twisted..., Klein Records, 2002
My Sound (CD), All Di Gal Com, G-Stone Recordings, 2002
Wicked Vinyl 01 (12"), Domo-Kun-Bogle, Not On Label, 2002
Babylon Is Ours - The USA In Dub (12"), Where You Gonna Run, Select Cuts, 2003
Feel Alive (12"), Hard Tobacco, Stereo Deluxe, 2003
Showgirlz (12"), El Ninjo (Luv Lite Mas..., Stereo Deluxe, 2003
Soul Strata (CD), Inna Meditation, Klein Records, 2003
Meat Beat Manifesto, ...In Dub (CD), Echo In Space Dub, Fro..., Run Recordings, 2004
Can I Get A Witness (12"), Babylon Times, Passin'..., Eighteenth Street Lounge Music, 2004
Covert Movements (CD), Once Inna Life, Counte..., Supa Crucial Recordings, 2004
IQU, Dirty Boy (12"), Dirty Boy (DJ Collage'..., Sonic Boom Recordings, 2004
Meat Beat Manifesto, Echo In Space Dub / Retrograde Pt. 2, Dub We R 1 (12"), Tino Corp., 2004
Meet The Babylonians (CD), Inter/Outernational, Klein Records, 2004
I-Wolf, Munchies (12"), Munchies (I-Wolf Remix), Cosmic Sounds, 2004
Phase Three (CD), Nu Styling, Klein Records, 2004
Phase Two (12"), Nu Styling, Born, Klein Records, 2004
See The Light (CD), Babylon Tymes, Twisted..., Eighteenth Street Lounge Music, 2004
Shockout (CD), Rude Boy Talk, Shockout, 2004
Ghislain Porier, Breakupdown (CD), Mic Diplomat, Chocolate Industries, 2005
Chocolate Swim (MP3), Mic Diplomat, [adult swim], Chocolate Industries, 2006
Fiplay ft Dj Collage & Aladin, Wickedsquad Dubplates Cd 1, Basstart Records,

Tracks Appear On:
It's a Berlin Thing Vol. 3 (2xCD), Tyme Bomb, Dangerous Drums, 2004
DJ Collage Presents the Parlor (CD), Masse-One, 2006

References

External links
Official web site
Myspace page
Discography

American reggae musicians
Living people
Year of birth missing (living people)